The 1970 Indiana Hoosiers football team represented the Indiana Hoosiers in the 1970 Big Ten Conference football season. The Hoosiers played their home games at Seventeenth Street Stadium in Bloomington, Indiana. The team was coached by John Pont, in his sixth year as head coach of the Hoosiers.

Schedule

1971 NFL draftees

References

Indiana
Indiana Hoosiers football seasons
Indiana Hoosiers football